Warren Day  (born March 1, 1946) is a former American actor best known for his role as Curtis in Andrew Marton's comedy film Birds Do It (1966). He additionally guest starred on the NBC television series Flipper (1965).

Life and career
Warren graduated South Broward High School in 1962. He spent 2 years after graduation studying acting at the Pasadena Playhouse in California. He did summer stock in Illinois and a touring theatre in parts of Pennsylvania and Miami. He had a guest role on the NBC television series Flipper (1965) which was filmed at Ivan Tors Studios in Miami. He portrayed a young Mexican fisherman. At 19-years-old, Warren made his feature film debut in Bob O'Donnell's faith-based educational film Misfit (1965) as a "religious dropout." Warren abandoned his plans of working in California for the emerging Miami and Southern Florida film industry, in which he deemed as a "lucrative field" for film. In 1965, he had a supporting role in the Robert Berswell directed play The Visit. He joined the Truly O'Possum's Theatre, a traveling theatre that would show 45-minutes of cartoons for children. In 1966, he portrayed Curtis in Andrew Marton's comedy film Birds Do It.

Film

Television

References

1946 births
Living people
20th-century American male actors
American male film actors
American male stage actors
Day, Warren